Autreville-sur-Moselle (literally Autreville on Moselle) is a commune in the Meurthe-et-Moselle department in northeastern France.

History 
Autreville-sur-Moselle is mentioned in several books about the Lorraine Campaign during World War II. The place was liberated from German occupation in early September 1944 by U.S. General George S. Patton's Third Army, especially its 3rd Battalion,.

Population

See also
Communes of the Meurthe-et-Moselle department

References

Communes of Meurthe-et-Moselle